The black-headed hemispingus (Pseudospingus verticalis) is a species of bird in the family Thraupidae.

It is found in Colombia, Ecuador, Peru, and Venezuela. Its natural habitat is subtropical or tropical moist montane forests.

References

black-headed hemispingus
Birds of the Colombian Andes
Birds of the Ecuadorian Andes
black-headed hemispingus
black-headed hemispingus
Taxonomy articles created by Polbot